Pleinmont-Torteval is an area in Guernsey. It is part of the parish of Torteval, which is split into two, by St. Pierre du Bois. The other part is often called just "Torteval" to distinguish it from "Pleinmont-Torteval".

References

Geography of Guernsey